= Instituto Superior Santo Domingo =

- Type: Private
- Established: 1986
- Location: Córdoba Capital, Córdoba, Argentina
- Campus: Urban
- Colors: Blue and White
- Website: www.issd.edu.ar

Instituto Superior Santo Domingo (ISSD) is a private-technical institute located in Córdoba, Argentina. ISSD was founded in 1986 in the city of Córdoba as a private third level education institute.

== History ==
The institution had its birth in 1986, with the aim of offering education in the area of Computing-Computer Science and Telecommunication. The institution began its (unofficial) educational activities on August 11, 1986 with the name of CEPRICyC (Private Training Center and Computing). In 1992 investigations were conducted to process the membership of formal education and under the supervision of official agency DIPE (Department of Private Colleges of the Province of Córdoba), under the Ministry of Education of the Province of Cordoba, the institute met all the requirements needed to become an official college, approving the respective inspections and finally began its (official) education activities in 1996.

== Academics ==
ISSD is an official institution of the Argentine Republic, specialized in technological, business and telecommunications careers. Their academic offers are:

- System Analyst (computing-computer science)
- Software Development
- Web Developer (computing-computer science)
- Telecommunication
- Business Management
